Capalaba Football Club (formerly the Capalaba Bulldogs Soccer Club) is a semi-professional Australian soccer club based in Capalaba, Queensland, a suburb of Brisbane, who plays in the National Premier Leagues Queensland.

History
The club was formed in 1972, and currently play in National Premier Leagues after being promoted from Football Queensland Premier League.

Home ground
The club plays out of John Fredericks Park on Old Cleveland Road Capalaba.

Personnel 
Current Personnel:

NPL Senior Head Coach: David Booth

NPL Senior Assistant Coach: Jordan Good

NPL 20's Head Coach: Minjae Lee

NPL U18's Head Coach: Andre Bennett

Current squad

References

External links
Capalaba Bulldogs Official Website

Association football clubs established in 1972
Soccer clubs in Brisbane
Brisbane Premier League teams
1972 establishments in Australia
Capalaba, Queensland